Capsazepine is a synthetic antagonist of capsaicin.  It is used as a biochemical tool in the study of TRPV ion channels.

Pharmacology
Capsazepine blocks the painful sensation of heat caused by capsaicin (the active ingredient of chilli pepper) which activates the TRPV1 ion channel. Capsazepine is therefore considered to be a TRPV1 antagonist. The TRPV1 channel functions as a pain and temperature sensor in mammalians. Capsazepine blocks the activation of TRPV1 channels by other chemicals, but not by other painful stimuli such as heat. Depending on the pharmacological assay, the IC50 is in the nanomolar to low micromolar range. In addition to its effects on TRPV1 channels, it was also shown to activate the noxious chemical sensor TRPA1 channel, inhibit the cold activated TRPM8 channel, voltage-activated calcium channels and nicotinic acetylcholine receptors. It mainly serves as a tool to study the TRPV1 ion channel.

Development
Capsazepine was discovered by a research group working for Novartis. Its synthesis and chemical properties were published in 1994. It was found by modification of the chemical backbone of capsaicin.

Use in biotechnology 
By incorporation of an azobenzene unit, a photoswitchable version of capsazepine (AC4) was developed in 2013 that allows for optical control of TRPV1 channels with light.

See also 
 Discovery and development of TRPV1 antagonists
 Menthol
 Herkinorin
 JWH-133

References 

Capsaicinoids
Catechols
Benzazepines
Chlorobenzenes
Thioureas